Charles Delbridge (April 1888 – 11 February 1924) was a South African cricketer. He played in nine first-class matches for Eastern Province from 1910/11 to 1912/13.

See also
 List of Eastern Province representative cricketers

References

External links
 

1888 births
1924 deaths
South African cricketers
Eastern Province cricketers
People from Mossel Bay
Cricketers from the Western Cape